Gurli Put Vo, also known as Dead Old Mans Pond, Koli-pat-vooka, or Kolipatvooka, is a populated place situated in Pima County, Arizona, United States. The official name became Gurli Put Vo in 1941 in a decision by the Board on Geographic Names.

References

Populated places in Pima County, Arizona